Tour de Beauce is a men's elite professional road bicycle racing multi-day event held each June in the Beauce region of Quebec, Canada since 1986. It is the oldest stage-race in North America, and is a Union Cycliste Internationale (UCI)-rated 2.2 continental circuit stage race on the UCI America Tour.

The Queen Stage of the Tour de Beauce features the ascension of the iconic Mont-Mégantic National Park, a 6-km climb averaging 10% and peaking at 18% on the highest elevation road in the Province of Quebec.

The race has five stages, including two half-stages, one of which is usually held in Quebec City. Quebec has hosted a stage of the Tour de Beauce for 25 consecutive years.

Classifications 
The race has five individual classifications, and the leader in each wears a special jersey.
 Yellow jersey: General classification (overall leader)
 White jersey: Sprint classification
 Polka dot jersey: Mountains classification
 Red jersey: Young rider classification
 Blue jersey: Winner of Quebec City Stage

Past winners

General classification

Points classification

Mountains classification

Team classification

References

External links 

Cycle races in Canada
Recurring sporting events established in 1986
Cycle racing in Quebec
UCI America Tour races
1986 establishments in Quebec
Beauce, Quebec
Sports competitions in Quebec